Rhombodera laticollis is a species of praying mantises in the family Mantidae, found in Malaysia and Indonesia.

See also
List of mantis genera and species

References

L
Mantodea of Asia
Insects described in 1838